The Guasare is a large coal field located in the west of Venezuela in Zulia. Guasare represents one of the largest coal reserve in Venezuela having estimated reserves of 8.62 billion tonnes of coal.

See also 
List of coalfields

References 

Coal in Venezuela